Nie Zuoren (born 15 January 1963) is a Chinese engineer who is a professor and president of Beijing University of Technology, and an academician of the Chinese Academy of Engineering.

Biography
Nie was born in Changsha, Hunan, on 15 January 1963. In 179, he attended Wuhan University of Technology, graduating in 1983 with a bachelor's degree. He went on to receive his master's degree in 1992 and doctor's degree in 1997 at Central South University of Technology (now Central South University).

From September 2002 to March 2004, he was a professor at Tokyo University and Nagoya University. In April 2013, he became the deputy president of Beijing University of Technology, rising to president in January 2021.

Honours and awards
 2008 State Technological Invention Award (Second Class)
 2010 State Science and Technology Progress Award (Second Class)
 2012 State Science and Technology Progress Award (Second Class)
 27 November 2017 Member of the Chinese Academy of Engineering (CAE)

References

1963 births
Living people
People from Changsha
Engineers from Hunan
Wuhan University of Technology alumni
Central South University alumni
Academic staff of Beijing University of Technology
Presidents of Beijing University of Technology
Members of the Chinese Academy of Engineering